Mazel is a surname. Notable people with the surname include:

 Eugène Mazel (1828–1890), French amateur botanist
 Ilya Mazel (aka Ruvim Mazel, 1890–1967), Soviet painter
 Isaak Mazel (1911–1945), Soviet chess master
 Judy Mazel (1943–2007), American weight loss advocate and author of The Beverly Hills Diet
 Leo Mazel (1907–2000), Soviet-Russian musicologist
 Maurice Mazel, prominent Chicago surgeon who founded Edgewater Hospital
 Olivier Mazel (1858–1940), French Army general during World War I
 Zvi Mazel (born 1939), Israeli diplomat

Mazel can also refer to:

 Luc Maezelle (born 1931), Belgian comic artist

See also 
 Mazel Group Engineering, a Barcelona based design studio specialising in concept cars and engineering solutions
 Mazel tov
 Maazel
 Mazenzele, Flemish village in the Belgian province Flemish-Brabant

Jewish surnames
Yiddish-language surnames